Hypothetical technologies are technologies that do not exist yet, but that could exist in the future. They are distinct from emerging technologies, which have achieved some developmental success. Emerging technologies as of 2018 include 3-D metal printing and artificial embryos. Many hypothetical technologies have been the subject of science fiction.

The criteria for this list are that the technology:

 Must not exist yet
 If the technology does not have an existing article (i.e. it is "redlinked"), a reference must be provided for it

Biology 

 Acne vaccine
 Anti-evolutionary drug
 Antiprion drug
 Artificial gametes
 Artificial gill
 Artificial "super" mitochondria
 Caries vaccine
 De-extinction
 Dyson tree
 Ethnic bioweapon
 Female sperm
 Flying syringe
 Hair cloning
 HIV vaccine
 Humanzee
 Life extension
 Liquid breathing
 Male egg
 Nanochondrion
 Nootropic
 Prime editing
 Respirocyte
 Synthetic epigenetics
 Universal flu vaccine
 Universal snakebite antidote

Engineering and manufacturing 

 Biogel refrigerator
 Chitin-cellulose composite
 Diamond trees
 Exoskeletal engine
 Mezoelectronics
 Microfactory
 Piezer
 Tectonic weapon
 Vertical zoo
 Wearable generator

Computing and robotics 

 Dentifrobot
 Hypercomputer
 Inferential programming
 Plant-based digital data storage
 Quantum memory
 Quantum money
 Robotoid
 Roll-away computer
 S-money
 Universal memory

Megastructures 

 Cloud Nine (tensegrity sphere)
 Globus Cassus
 Seascraper
 Shellworld
 Vertical city

Nanotechnology 

 Bush robot
 Claytronics
 Grey goo
 Mechanosynthesis
 Molecular assembler
 Nanocomputer
 Nanomatrix skyscraper
 Programmable matter
 Santa Claus machine
 Utility fog
 Wet nanotechnology
 Zettascale computing

Transport 

 Bering Strait crossing
 ET3 Global Alliance
 Flying submarine
 Gravity train
 Gravity-vacuum transit
 Transatlantic tunnel
 Vacuum airship
 Water-fueled car

Minds and psychology 

 Artificial general intelligence
 Brain in a vat
 Brainwashing
 Cortical modem
 Digital immortality
 Endoneurobot
 Gliabot
 Global brain
 Infomorph
 Intelligence amplification
 Language-learning pill
 Matrioshka brain
 Memory editing
 Mind uploading
 Moral enhancement
 Omega Point
 Simulated reality
 Sphalerizer
 Superintelligence
 Synaptobot
 Technological singularity
 Thought recording and reproduction device
 Universal translator

Physics 

 Anti-gravity
 Antimatter weapon
 Artificial gravity
 Brownian ratchet
 Cloaking device
 Cold fusion
 Coleopter
 Computronium
 Electrogravitics
 Faster than light communication
 Femtotechnology
 Fusion torch
 Gamma-ray bomb
 Gravitational shielding
 Hafnium bomb
 Inertia negation
 Monopolium
 Muon collider
 Neutronium
 Nuclear bullet
 Nuclear clock
 Nuclear lightbulb
 Nuclear shaped charge
 Organic nuclear reactor
 Perpetual motion
 Phased-array optics
 Picotechnology
 Plasmonster
 Project Excalibur
 Pure fusion weapon
 Room-temperature superconductor
 Space-time cloak
 Tachyonic antitelephone
 Teleforce
 Teleporter
 Time machine
 Tipler cylinder
 Torsion field (pseudoscience)
 Tractor beam
 Wet workshop

Space 

 Alderson disk
 Alcubierre drive
 Antimatter rocket
 Artificial universe
 Asteroid laser ablation
 Beam powered propulsion
 Bernal sphere
 Bias drive
 Bishop ring
 Black hole starship
 Bracewell probe
 Bussard ramjet
 Dean drive
 Diametric drive
 Dipole drive
 Disjunction drive
 Dyson sphere
 Dyson–Harrop satellite
 Enzmann starship
 Field propulsion
 Fission sail
 Ford-Svaiter mirror
 Fusion rocket
 Gravity tractor
 Halo drive
 Information panspermia
 Isotropic beacon
 Krasnikov tube
 Laser broom
 Laser propulsion
 Launch loop
 Lightcraft
 Lunarcrete
 Lunar space elevator
 MagBeam
 Magnetic sail
 McKendree cylinder
 Momentum exchange tether
 Nano electrokinetic thruster
 Nanoship
 Non-rocket spacelaunch
 Nuclear pulse propulsion
 Nuclear salt-water rocket
 O'Neill cylinder
 Orbital ring
 Ouroboros habitat
 Photon rocket
 Photonic railway
 Pitch drive
 Plasma bubble
 Quantum telescope
 Quantum vacuum thruster
 Quasite
 Ringworld
 Reactionless drive
 RF resonant cavity thruster
 Rocket sled launch
 Rotating wheel space station
 Self-replicating spacecraft
 Skyhook
 Solar thermal rocket
 Soletta
 Space coach
 Space dock
 Space elevator
 Space fountain
 Space gun
 Space mirror
 Space tether
 Space tug
 Spomified asteroid
 Stanford torus
 Starlifting
 Starseed launcher
 StarTram
 Statite
 Stellar engine
 Sun scoop
 Terrascope
 Thermonuclear micro-bomb engine
 Topopolis

See also 

 List of emerging technologies
 List of existing technologies predicted in science fiction
 List of fictional aircraft
 List of fictional artificial intelligences
 List of fictional cars
 List of fictional cyborgs
 List of fictional doomsday devices
 List of fictional galactic communities
 List of fictional robots and androids
 List of fictional gynoids
 List of fictional space stations
 List of fictional spacecraft
 List of fictional vehicles

References